Princess Kusakanohatabino-hime (? – after 405) was Empress of Japan as the consort of Emperor Richū.

Daughter of Emperor Ōjin; aunt of Emperor Richū. Gave birth to Nakashi.

Issue
, wife of Prince Ōkusaka, later married Emperor Anko

Notes

Japanese empresses
Year of death missing
Japanese princesses
4th-century Japanese women
5th-century Japanese women